La Gantoise HC, also known as Gantoise is a Belgian sports club based in Ghent, Brussels. The club is most well known for its field hockey section with both the first men's and women's teams playing in the Belgian Hockey League.

The Gantoise women are the current title holders in the Belgian Hockey League, as well as the EuroHockey Club Trophy.

History
While La Gantoise was originally founded in 1864, the hockey section was not formed until 1914.

The first edition of the Belgian Hockey League, known simply as 'The Championship' at the time, was held following the conclusion of World War One. La Gantoise placed well, finishing in fourth place, only to win the following year. 

At the club's 100th anniversary, in 1964, La Gantoise had 150 members, forming 10 teams. 

The club continued to grow, eventually forming women's teams, who reached the top level of Belgian hockey in 2003. Three years later, in 2006, the women's first team reached a pinnacle by becoming champions of Belgium for the first time.

The second field at La Gantoise is named after Yves Bernaert, one of Belgium's most prolific former international players.

Honours

Men
Belgian Hockey League
 Winners (1): 1920–21

Women
Belgian Hockey League
 Winners (4): 2005–06, 2008–09, 2020–21, 2021–22

EuroHockey Club Trophy
 Winners (1): 2021

Current squads

Men

Head coach: Pascal Kina

Women

Head coach: Kevan DeMartinis

References

External links
Official website

 
Belgian field hockey clubs
1864 establishments in Belgium
Field hockey clubs established in 1914
Sport in East Flanders
Sport in Ghent